Ziros (named after Lake Ziros) is a municipality in the Preveza regional unit, Epirus, Greece. The seat of the municipality is the village Filippiada. The municipality has an area of 380.601 km2.

Municipality
The municipality Ziros was formed at the 2011 local government reform by the merger of the following 4 former municipalities, that became municipal units:
Anogeio
Filippiada
Kranea
Thesprotiko

References

Populated places in Preveza (regional unit)
Municipalities of Epirus (region)